Charles Wickliffe Roark (January 22, 1877 – April 5, 1929) was a U.S. Representative from Kentucky.

Born in Greenville, Kentucky, Roark attended the public schools and the Greenville Seminary. He was founder and president of the Greenville Milling Co. He served as president of the Kentucky Retail Lumbermen in 1908 and of the Tri-State Lumber Dealers' Association in 1909.

Roark was elected mayor of Greenville and served from 1918 to 1922.

Roark was elected as a Republican to the Seventy-first Congress and served from March 4, 1929, until his death, before the convening of Congress. He died in Louisville, Kentucky, April 5, 1929 and was interred in the family lot in Evergreen Cemetery in Greenville.

See also
List of United States Congress members who died in office (1900–49)

References

1877 births
1929 deaths
People from Greenville, Kentucky
Republican Party members of the United States House of Representatives from Kentucky
Mayors of places in Kentucky
20th-century American politicians